Alexandru Iulian Stănică (born 6 September 2000) is a Romanian professional footballer who plays as a defender for Liga II club Concordia Chiajna. He made his debut in Liga I on 21 December 2018, in a match between Sepsi Sfântu Gheorghe and Concordia Chiajna, ended with the score of 3-0.

References

External links
 
 
 Alexandru Stănică at lpf.ro

2000 births
Living people
People from Giurgiu County
Romanian footballers
Association football defenders
Liga I players
Liga II players
Liga III players
CS Concordia Chiajna players